Paris Métro Line 12 (opened as Line A; French: Ligne 12 du métro de Paris) is one of the sixteen lines of the Paris Métro. It links Issy-les-Moulineaux, a suburban town southwest of Paris, to Mairie d'Aubervilliers, in the town of Aubervilliers in the north. With over 84 million journeys per year, Line 12 is the eleventh busiest line of the network. It has several important stops, such as Madeleine, the 6th arrondissement of Paris, Porte de Versailles and two national railway stations, Gare Montparnasse and Gare Saint-Lazare. The service runs every day of the week, and the line uses MF 67 series trains, the network's standard since the early 1970s.

Line 12 was founded as Line A by the Nord-Sud Company, who also built Line 13. It was built between 1905 and 1910, to connect the districts of Montparnasse, in the south, and Montmartre, in the north. The first trip, from Porte de Versailles to Notre-Dame-de-Lorette, was on 5 November 1910. The line was the second to be built on the north–south axis of the city, in competition with Line 4 of the Compagnie du chemin de fer métropolitain de Paris (CMP; Paris Metropolitan Railway Company). It was extended bit by bit until 1934 when it reached Mairie d'Issy in the south. Tunnelling to the northern terminus at the Porte de la Chapelle on the perimeter of Paris had been completed in 1916. In 1930, the CMP bought the Nord-Sud company and Line A was integrated into the new, unified network as Line 12. In 1949, the CMP was itself merged into the RATP, Paris's public transport company. They operate the line today and have plans to extend it south as far as the town of Issy-les-Moulineaux and north to La Plaine in Saint-Denis.

The line was built using cut-and-cover excavation techniques. Since this method cannot be used under buildings, the route follows the streets above. It remains unchanged today and many original design features, such as the Nord-Sud company's refined ceramic decor, remain in the stations. Some stations are decorated thematically: Assemblée Nationale has murals explaining the intricacies of the lower house of the French Parliament, while the tiling at Concorde represents an extract from the Declaration of the Rights of Man and of the Citizen (1789).

History

Planning (1901–1905)
Engineer Jean-Baptiste Berlier proposed to the City of Paris to finance and build a new line linking the areas of Montmartre and Gare Saint-Lazare in the north with Montparnasse and Vaugirard in the south. The line would establish a second north–south transport axis of the city, west of the existing line four. Berlier's design of two deep, parallel, iron-lined tunnels was modelled on the London Underground system. This method allowed the straightest line possible to be built, without passing underneath buildings and free from interference with underground sewers. The City Council liked the plan and on 28 December 1901 granted the tender for a Montparnasse-Montmartre line to Messrs Janicot and Berlier. In June 1902, a new company, new competitor of the "Parisian Metropolitan Rail Company" (CMP), was established : the Nord-Sud Company (in French ). The grant to build what would become Line A was transferred to the Nord-Sud Company; which was approved on 26 March 1907. While the infrastructure of the CMP was financed by the city corporation, Nord-Sud project was the sole responsibility of the Nord-Sud Company.

The link between two important but distant urban centres guaranteed heavy traffic for the line and it would also directly compete with the CMP and tramway companies, threatening their monopoly across the city. The City was wary of inciting new demands to license other lines, and of eventually provoking industrial disorder, something already experienced on the tramway network. French law required a Déclaration d'utilité publique ("Declaration of Public Utility"), a statement of the project's public benefit before municipal construction, the concerns meant that it was not promulgated for the  line until 3 April 1905. The law announced the creation "of [] public utility, of local interest, this establishment, in Paris, of a railroad, electrically powered, dedicated to the transport of passengers and their hand-luggage, from Montmartre to Montparnasse".

Construction and opening (1907–1910)

The boggy undersoil of Paris made it impossible for the engineers to follow their initial concept of deeply excavated, metal-lined tunnels: digging deeper to more stable ground would raise costs. The line was finally established immediately underneath the streets using the cut and cover method of the CMP's lines, then the standard in use on the Metropolitan system. As a consequence, the layout contains several difficult curves especially in the northern part where narrow streets have a winding route. The line had 23 stations, all with vaulted roof construction. An interchange with lines A and B was established at Saint-Lazare, but there was no connection with the CMP's lines.

Work on the sub-fluvial tunnel underneath the Seine, between the Chambre des Députés station (now known as Assemblée nationale) and Concorde, took place between July 1907 and July 1909. At the back, a mobile arm turned on the axis of the tunnelling shield to install panels on walls of the tunnel.

Each ring was constructed from ten  panels, with one  counter-key panel and a  key panel to lock the segments in place. Work was delayed by the 1910 Great Flood of Paris. During the works, the future Chambre des Députés station housed an air and water compressor. The compressed air prevented the collapse of the digging shield from the weight of the waters above. The tubes, initially unlined apart from the cast iron rings, were covered with an internal protective layer of masonry in 1920.

The section from Porte de Versailles to Notre-Dame-de-Lorette was inaugurated on 4 November 1910 and opened to the public on the next day. Porte de Versailles was set up as a terminus station with a connection to a workshop. The latter was joined by to the Petite Ceinture rail line, which allowed for the transfer of trains between lines. At the other end, the provisional terminus at Notre-Dame-de-Lorette was set up with three tracks including a central depot.

On the opening day, public representatives rode from Notre-Dame-de-Lorette to Porte de Versailles, and returned to Gare Saint-Lazare for a buffet held in the rotunda. The press reports were laudatory, commenting on the smoothness of journey, and their brightness of the stations. From the beginning, the traffic on the line was significant and the quantity of rolling stock had quickly to be increased. From 5 November 1910 until 30 June 1911, the line carried 29,263,610 passengers.

Developments to the present

On 8 April 1911, the line was extended north to Pigalle. A subsequent three station extension to Jules Joffrin proved particularly difficult. The route passed underneath the hill of Montmartre, which had long been quarried and mined for gypsum to make plaster of paris. During the construction of the tunnel, numerous unknown quarries were discovered forcing a change in the line's route to avoid them. The engineers constructed arches underground to support the weight of the gypsum above. The extension was put into service on 30 October 1912.

Work on the final extension northwards began in September 1912, but the tunnel was not finished at the beginning of the First World War. Though lacking personnel, the construction work continued at a slower pace. On 23 August 1916, in the middle of the war, the line reached Porte de la Chapelle. This extension comprised three new stations, of which the final included three tracks and two central platforms, the central track being used by trains leaving or arriving. Line A intersected with Line 4 at Marcadet – Poissonniers, but no transfer had yet been set up.

On 1 January 1930, the CMP absorbed the Nord-Sud company, and line A became line 12 of the Métropolitain network on 27 March 1931. The line that bore the number 12 in the 1922 plan for a complementary network, from Porte d'Orleans to Porte d'Italie, was abandoned. Thinking that the number of trains on the line was insufficient, the CMP transferred four trains from their holding to augment the service.

The Nord-Sud company lines were powered through overhead cables, whereas the third rail system was in use on the CMP's network. With the ownership transition, the CMP standard was adopted on the lines 12 and 13. As a result, the overhead cables of the Nord-Sud were decommissioned in 1932, one year after those of line 13. Pantographs continued to be used in the Vaugirard workshop. To improve the connection of the lines and facilitate the transfer of the carriages, a new link was built in 1935, between the Montparnasse station and the Vavin station of line 4.

The platforms of the old station were removed and sidings were installed to house trains not in use. On 24 March 1934, the southern extension to Mairie d'Issy was inaugurated, the same day as that of line 1 to Château de Vincennes.

On the night of 20 April 1944, during the Liberation of Paris, the freight station of Porte de la Chapelle and the RATP central workshop on rue Championnet were bombarded. The former, which is also the line's terminus, was severely damaged though hasty repairs returned it to service a few days later.

The line was equipped with a centralised control room in 1971. In 1977 the use of MF 67 rolling stock allowed the inauguration of Automatic Train Control on Line 12. A project to extend the line northwards began in 2007. The first phase of the extension is to Front Populaire, which was opened to the public on 18 December 2012. A further extension, via Aimé Césaire to Mairie d'Aubervilliers, opened on 31 May 2022.

Time-line
5 November 1910: Line A of the Nord-Sud company was opened from Porte de Versailles to Notre-Dame de Lorette.
8 April 1911: The line was extended northbound from Notre-Dame de Lorette to Pigalle.
31 October 1912: The line was extended from Pigalle to Jules Joffrin.
23 August 1916: The line was extended from Jules Joffrin to Porte de la Chapelle.
1930: The Nord-Sud company was bought by the CMP company. Line A became line 12.
24 March 1934: The line was extended from Porte de Versailles to Mairie d'Issy.
18 December 2012: The line was extended from Porte de la Chapelle to Aubervilliers - Saint-Denis - Front Populaire.
31 May 2022: The line was extended from Front Populaire to Mairie d'Aubervilliers.

Route 

It is, by design, a particularly twisting route with multiple corners and steep climbs.

Beginning at Issy-les-Moulineaux, south-west of Paris, with a three way tunnel underneath l'avenue Victor-Cresson, the terminus is at Mairie d'Issy, and has only two tracks. It runs north-east, entering Paris at Porte de Versailles, a major station with three tracks, one of which gives access to the workshop at Vaugirard. The line then runs underneath rue de Vaugirard, following all the bends of this narrow street.

After Falguière, the line veers back south-east in a  radius bend underneath the boulevard du Montparnasse. It connects with line 13 at Montparnasse – Bienvenüe, and exit leads toward the Tour Montparnasse. Before the station, a two-way tunnel branches right (i.e., south), the beginning of a planned branch line to la Porte de Vanves (which later became line C of the Nord-Sud Company). This branch was in turn integrated into the original line 14 of the Métropolitain system, and became a part of line 13 when 13 and 14 were joined at the Seine. The Vanves branch now serves as a depot and workshop.

After the Rue du Bac station, it runs north underneath the Boulevard Saint-Germain until the river Seine, under which it (and the tunnel of RER Line C) passes via a 4 per cent descent and 3.5 per cent climb, to reappear on the Right Bank. After Concorde, the tunnel burrows below that of Line 1, then follows a twisting route through Rue Saint Florentin, then Rue du Chevalier-de-Saint-George and finally Rue Duphot before reaching Madeleine, named after the Église de la Madeleine, where the bend necessitates curved platforms.

The route also goes underneath the tunnel of the new Line 14, and twists north underneath Rue Tronchet. After intersecting with Line 13, it reaches Saint-Lazare by a curve with a radius of just , turning east under Rue Saint-Lazare.

Between the Trinité station and the Notre-Dame-de-Lorette station the tunnel has three lines, including a central one which connects the two at the exit of Trinité. This extra track was used for a long time to move the trains of Line 13 from the Vaugirard workshop back to their line (before the merger with the old line 14 the extension towards Châtillon – Montrouge and the creation of a new workshop).

In preparation for the ascent of the Montmartre hill, the line veers sharply north in two curves of  radius, putting the tunnel under Rue Notre-Dame-de-Lorette. There it climbs on a 4 per cent slope until the next station, Saint-Georges, which is divided by a pedestrian access way. Line 12 climbs on towards Pigalle station, where the Moulin Rouge is
situated, and it intersects with and runs under Line 2 and passes under a sewer.

At Lamarck-Caulaincourt station, the line reaches its highest point, after which it makes a 4 per cent descent towards Jules-Joffrin station, situated under Rue Ordener, then to Marcadet-Poissoniers station, where the line again crosses Line 4. The tunnel runs underneath the railways departing from Gare du Nord, then slants northwards in a  radius curve into Marx Dormoy station, in the Goutte d'Or neighbourhood. The line continues down a slope of 2.6 per cent, with new bends, before arriving at Porte de la Chapelle station, on the northern edge of Paris. This station was previously the northern terminus and has three lines with platforms, leading into a four-tunnel depot. Beyond the depot, a new tunnel was constructed for the first phase of the extension towards Aubervillers, passing underneath the ring road, and exiting the northern fringe of Paris for the first time. After an eastward curvature, the line arrives at Aubervillers - Front Populaire, the first modern station of Line 12. The new station is situated at the edge of Saint-Denis and Aubervilliers, and is a traditional 2-track layout with platforms on either side of the track. After this, the line continues via Aimé Césaire to Mairie d'Aubervilliers(From :fr:Ligne 12 du métro de Paris).

Stations

Line 12 consists of 31 stations, including 12 with connections to 9 other metro lines and one RER line, two Transilien networks and two national railway stations.

Design features

Because of the competition with the CMP, the Nord-Sud company paid a special attention to design elements. One of the notable elements is the Saint-Lazare station in which architect Lucien Bechmann designed a rotunda for the tickets and transfer room. The station entrances of the Nord-Sud company, in ceramic and iron, are of a more sober styling than the Art nouveau designs of Hector Guimard for the CMP's entrances. The word "Nord-Sud" appeared in white on red for the maximum visibility at a distance. In the 1970s, the Hector Guimard entrance from Hotel de Ville station was moved to Abbesses station.

In the stations, the supporting walls are vertical and not vaulted, and the ceramic tiles carry the customary "NS" logo of the company. The tile trims are brown in stations without a transfer, and green in those with. Madeleine station has blue tile trim because of its connection with the CMP. In addition, on the headwalls of the tunnels a signage indicate the direction of the trains accompanied by an arrow indicating the platform on the right. All stations on the line inside Paris had this signage, though some have disappeared in renovations over the years. At each station between Solférino and Notre-Dame des Champs (except Rue du Bac) are inscribed "DIRON MONTPARNASSE" or "DIRON MONTMARTRE". In the north, at Marcadet – Poissonniers, Lamarck – Caulaincourt and Abbesses, the signs on the headwalls are "DIRON PTE de VERSAILLES"/"DIRON PTE de LA CHAPELLE". In the south, at Falguière, the signs are "DIRON PTE de VERSAILLES"/"DIRON MONTMARTRE".

Two stations, due to their depth underground, have lifts: Abbesses and Lamarck – Caulaincourt. Five stations have unique décor, each based around a single theme: Abbesses, Concorde, Assemblée nationale, Montparnasse – Bienvenüe and Pasteur.

Abbesses station can be accessed via two shafts, one for the lifts, the other the stairs which are decorated with, on the descent, famous sights in Montmartre such as the Moulin Rouge, Sacré Coeur or place des Abbesses, and depictions of nature and daily life while ascending. This installation was painted in 2007 to replace a mosaic patchwork previously done by artists from the area, which had been vandalised over the years.

Concorde station was renovated in the early 1990s, it is decorated with small ceramic tiles, each depicting a different letter. Together forming extracts from the Déclaration des droits de l'homme et du citoyen de 1789, the design was conceived by Françoise Schein.

Since 1990, Assemblée nationale station no longer carries election material, but the posters show heads in silhouette, representing the deputies of l'Assemblée nationale. It was designed by Jean-Charles Blais and is regularly refreshed according to the parliamentary calendar.

Montparnasse – Bienvenüe station is named after its location and the "father" of the Metropolitan system in Paris, Fulgence Bienvenüe. Thus it was a natural choice for an exhibition on the technology and literature of the metro, in celebration of its centenary in 2000. Extracts from works about the Metro adorn the walls of its corridors.

Pasteur station has an exhibition dedicated to medicine, installed during the centenary of the Metro and the renovation of the station on Line 6. The panels depict the evolution of biology and medicine since Louis Pasteur, in the context of the time, and with various anecdotes.

Renamed stations 
The names of six stations have been changed since the line's opening:
1923: Sèvres – Croix Rouge renamed Sèvres – Babylone.
25 August 1931: Marcadet renamed Marcadet – Poissoniers.
6 October 1942: Montparnasse renamed Montparnasse – Bienvenüe.
15 October 1945: Petits Ménages renamed Corentin Celton in honour of a member of the French Resistance who was working at the Hospice of the Petits Ménages and who was killed by the Nazis during the occupation.
11 May 1946: Torcy renamed Marx-Dormoy.
1989: Chambre des Députés renamed Assemblée Nationale.

Operation

Service

In 2011, the end to end journey time was 35 minutes southwards and 36 minutes northwards. As with all Metro lines, the first trains leave at 05:30, from both terminus as well as from Porte de Versailles station.

On most days, the last northbound train leaves Mairie d’Issy station at 00:39. The last southbound trains leave Porte de la Chapelle station at 00:39 and 00:42, the second terminating at Porte de Versailles station. On Fridays and Saturdays, the final departures are at 01:39. The train frequency is every two to four minutes during the day, and five to seven minutes in the late evening. The frequency on Sundays is four to six minutes. After 00:30 on Friday and Saturday evenings and bank holidays, the interval between trains is 10 minutes. The RATP employs two categories of staff: ticketing agents and drivers. The former manage the stations, sell tickets and look after passengers. Drivers are responsible for the operation of the trains.

Rolling stock
At its inception Line 12 operated four-motor Sprague-Thomson trains, equipped with 600 volt pantographs and scrubbers, the overhead system which supplies the trains with electricity. After the integration of the line into the CMP network, the overhead lines and pantographs were removed. The trains remained unique, using a grey and blue colour scheme for the 2nd class cars and red and yellow for 1st class until 1972.

When Line 7 was modernised with new MF 67 stock between 1971 and 1973, its old Sprague-Thomson trains were transferred to Line 12 to replenish the worn out equipment from the Nord-Sud company. The last train was replaced in May 1972. Line 12 continued to use the Sprague-Thomson equipment for another six years, until 1978, when it was provided with new MF 67 stock.

Intermittently, the MF 2000 stock trains are tested along the Line 12 corridor.

Workshops 

The rolling stock of Line 12 is maintained at the Vaugirard workshop, situated underground in the 15th arrondissement of Paris between the rues Croix-Nivert, Desnouettes and Lecourbe, and Lycée Louis-Armand. They connect with the main line on the tunnels toward the Mairie d'Issy station, north until the Porte de Versailles station. It is also connected to the Petite Ceinture, a minor disused railway, by tracks which cross Rue Desnouettes.

As with all rolling stock on the system, heavy maintenance, such as the replacement of worn parts (batteries, paint, springs, etc.), happens at the Choisy workshops. Opened in 1931, the Choisy workshops are underground in the 13th arrondissement, close to the Boulevard Périphérique, and accessible via a fork in line 7. There are two parts, one for maintenance of carriages of Line 7, the other for repairs on trains from all lines on the network. In 2007, it was staffed by 330 workmen.

Ticketing and finance
The Metro ticketing system uses the "t+" ticket, which permits a journey of any distance and allows unlimited transfers between Metro lines and to the RER within central Paris.

The cost of operating the line is met by the RATP, though ticket prices are set politically and do not reflect the true cost of operating the system. The difference is covered by the Syndicat des transports d'Île-de-France, the regional public transport coordinating authority. It sets the general conditions, frequency and duration of services. Their operating cost is financed by an annual block grant raised through a transport tax on businesses and payments from local authorities.

Traffic
Line 12's traffic load is about average for the Métro; the total number of travellers is less than half that of Line 1 and approximately two-thirds of lines 6 and 13. From 1992 to 2004, traffic grew by 0.5%, the 11th (of 13) strongest in terms of traffic growth (excluding Line 14, completed in 1998).

The busiest stations are Saint-Lazare (34.53 million) and Montparnasse – Bienvenüe (29.46 million), both of which serve multiple lines.

Safety record 
There have been two accidents on the line: On 23 April 1930, a collision was caused by human error close to the Porte de Versailles station. A train moving north was stopped before a red signal between Porte de Versailles and Convention stations. A second hit it hard from behind, the driver having passed two stop signals at full speed. Two people were killed, and there were numerous injuries. A derailment on 30 August 2000. The train's automatic control function was broken, and the driver was unused to driving manually and arrived too fast into the steep decline before Notre-Dame-de-Lorette station. The derailment turned the car upside-down, and 24 people were injured. The investigation concluded that a specific emergency signal be installed on the approach to the station, and that drivers preserve their skills by not habitually driving with the auto-pilot function.

Future

Northern extension 
An extension north to the provisionally named Proudhon-Gardinoux station on the boundary between Saint-Denis and Aubervilliers opened in 2012. The station will serve La Plaine Saint-Denis, a diverse district that includes many television studios. Initially called "Proudhon – Gardinoux" in the planning stages of the project (after the intersection of rue Proudhon and rue des Gardinoux), the name of the new station will be Front Populaire after the adjacent well-known square.

Construction began in the second half of 2007, and the tunnel boring machine started to operate in 2009. The tunnel will be dug as far as Aubervilliers, but the entrances to the Pont de Stains and Mairie d'Aubervilliers stations will not be built until later. Works on the first stage cost 198.5 million euros (48% from regional funding, 27.5% from the state, 8.5% from the Department's General Council, 16% from the RATP – on a loan approved by the region).

In a second phase, two further stations, at Aimé Césaire and Mairie d'Aubervilliers, opened on 31 May 2022. The final plan sees the extension running all the way to RER B at La Courneuve, where the SDRIF plans an ultimate terminus at the tramway station of Tramway Line 1.

Southern extension
A southern extension into the municipality of Issy-les-Moulineaux is envisaged. Discussed at length since the last extension of the line to Mairie d'Issy in 1934, it would run at least up to Gare d'Issy, or possibly all the way to Les Moulineaux thus permitting transfers with Tramway T2 and creating the Issy-Ville station. The project was included in phases 2 or 3 of the Île-de-France regional master plan (SDRIF) adopted on 25 September 2008, with an expected start in 2014 or 2020.

See also

Notes

References

External links

RATP official website 
RATP English language website
Interactive Map of the RER
Interactive Map of the Paris métro
Metro-Pole website, dedicated to Paris public transports (unofficial) 

 
Railway lines opened in 1910
Articles containing video clips